Shojaabad-e Mohammad Ali (also Romanized as Shojā‘ābād-e Moḩammad ʿAlī; also known as Seh Jāābād, Shojā‘ābād-e Moḩammad Qolī, and Shojā‘ābād-e Shomālī) is a village in Takab Rural District, Shahdad District, Kerman County, Kerman Province, Iran. At the 2006 census, its population was 221, in 53 families.

References 

Populated places in Kerman County